The Encyclopedia of Concise Concepts by Women Philosophers, (ECC), is an online encyclopedia that exclusively contains entries on concepts from the work of female philosophers. The ECC is an open access database developed by the Center for the History of Women Philosophers and Scientists that went online on June 15, 2018. Each entry contains a brief explanation of a philosophical concept developed or significantly advanced by a woman philosopher as well as a list of primary and secondary sources for further research. The articles deal with female philosophers from the history of philosophy, from antiquity to the present. The articles are written by internationally recognized researchers and peer-reviewed before publication. The encyclopedia is part of the digital collection of Paderborn University and articles include a DOI handle to make them available as official academic sources.

Editors-in-chief are Ruth Hagengruber and Mary Ellen Waithe.

Weblinks 

 Encyclopedia of Concise Concepts by Women Philosophers

References 

Encyclopedias of philosophy
History of philosophy
Women and philosophy
German encyclopedias